This article is a list of known legal cases involving super-injunctions, a type of anonymised privacy injunction that prevents both (a) the publication of why an injunction has been obtained and (b) the publication that an injunction has been obtained. Due to their nature this list can only include known super-injunctions that have either been disclosed voluntarily, breached in contempt of court, discontinued or revealed using parliamentary privilege. Super-injunctions should not be confused with anonymised privacy injunctions that do not prevent publication of the fact that an injunction has been obtained.

List of known super-injunction cases

References

External links
Guardian section on super-injunctions

English privacy law
Injunctions in English law